Colonel Henry Thomas Fenwick  (20 December 1863 – 30 August 1939) was a British army officer and Liberal Party politician.

Biography

Fenwick was the son of Henry Fenwick and Jane Lutwidge Cookson, and entered the army in 1885.

He changed to a political career when he was elected as the Member of Parliament (MP) for Houghton-le-Spring at the 1892 general election, and held the seat until he stood down at the 1895 general election.

In 1899 he was again in active service, as 2nd in Command of the Royal Horse Guards.
He served with the regiment during the Second Boer War in South Africa 1899–1901, was mentioned in despatches, and appointed a Companion of the Distinguished Service Order (DSO) for his services in November 1900.

After the war, he was appointed Commander of the Royal Horse Guards.

References

External links 
 

1863 births
1939 deaths
Liberal Party (UK) MPs for English constituencies
UK MPs 1892–1895
Companions of the Order of St Michael and St George
Companions of the Distinguished Service Order
Members of the Royal Victorian Order